Say It With Your Eyes is a South Korean television drama produced and broadcast by MBC from March 19, 2000, to March 25, 2001.

Story

Cast
 Kam Woo-sung as Ki-woong
 Go Soo as Ki-ryong (Ki-woong's younger brother)
 Kim Sung-kyum as Ki-woong's father (a retired detective)
 Jeon Hye-jin as In-kyung
 Lee Jung-gil as In-kyung's father 
 Yoon Mi-ra as In-kyung's aunt
 Song Ji-eun
 Sa Mi-ja  
 Lee Jin-woo as product planning representative  
 Lee Ah-hyun as product planning employee 
 Kim Hyung-il
 Park Gwang-jeong as product planning team manager
 Kim Yong-hee
 Yun Hae
 Lee Hee-do

References

MBC TV television dramas
2000 South Korean television series debuts
2001 South Korean television series endings
Korean-language television shows